Model is a surname. Notable people with the surname include:
 Abram Model (1896–1976), Russian chess master
 Alice Model (1856–1943), leader of the Union of Jewish Women
 Ben Model (born 1962), American collector, publisher, and presenter of silent films
 Lisette Model (1901–1983), Austrian-born American photographer
 Walter Model (1891–1945), German field marshal of World War II